L-serine-phosphatidylethanolamine phosphatidyltransferase (phosphatidylserine synthase 2, serine-exchange enzyme II, PTDSS2 (gene)) is an enzyme with systematic name L-1-phosphatidylethanolamine:L-serine phosphatidyltransferase. This enzyme catalyses the following chemical reaction

 L-1-phosphatidylethanolamine + L-serine  L-1-phosphatidylserine + ethanolamine

This enzyme catalyses replacement of a polar head group of phosphatidylethanolamine with L-serine.

References

External links 
 

EC 2.7.8